The Kashmir musk deer (Moschus cupreus) is an endangered species of musk deer native to Afghanistan, India, and Pakistan. Recent studies have shown that the species is also native to western Nepal. This species was originally described as a subspecies to the alpine musk deer, but is now classified as a separate species.

The Kashmir musk deer, which is one of seven similar species found throughout Asia, is endangered due to habitat loss and also because of poachers hunting the animal for its prized scent glands.

In Afghanistan no musk deer sighting had been scientifically reported from 1948 until 2009. A survey conducted in June 2009 by WCS in the province of Nuristan, Afghanistan found at least three specimens, confirming that the species still persists in this country despite unregulated hunting, extensive deforestation, habitat degradation, and the absence of the rule of law. In summer, musk deer inhabit remote alpine scrub on scattered rock outcrops and in upper fringes of closed coniferous forests at an elevation of  using invariably use steep slopes (≥ 20°). Although relatively vast, the area of habitat potentially available to musk deer in Afghanistan appears to be highly fragmented.

References

Notes

Kashmir musk deer
Fauna of Jammu and Kashmir
Mammals of Afghanistan
Mammals of Pakistan
Kashmir musk deer
Mammals of Nepal